Hujjat al-Islam Ahmad Ahmadi (6 September 1933 in Malayer – 8 June 2018 in Tehran) was an Iranian scholar, Islamic philosopher and politician. He was a member of the Iranian Majlis, Islamic Cultural Revolution Council and was a member of the Supreme Council of the Cultural Revolution from 1980 to 1987.

See also 

 Supreme Council of the Cultural Revolution
 Islamic Cultural Revolution

References 

1933 births
2018 deaths
Iranian Islamic religious leaders
Deputies of Tehran, Rey, Shemiranat and Eslamshahr
Islamic philosophers
Members of the 7th Islamic Consultative Assembly
Alliance of Builders of Islamic Iran politicians
Faculty of Letters and Humanities of the University of Tehran alumni
Qom Seminary alumni
People from Malayer